Goniagnathini is a tribe of leafhoppers in the subfamily Deltocephalinae. Goniagnathini contains 4 genera and around 60 species. Of these, one new species, Goniagnathus cornutus was recently verified in China.

Genera 
There are currently four described genera in Goniagnathini:

References 

Deltocephalinae